Wurm (=Worm) ist a German-language surname.

 Armin Wurm (born 1989), German professional hockey player
 Erwin Wurm (born 1954), Austrian artist
 Frank Wurm (1924–1993), American baseball player
 Frederick Wurm, full name Louis Friedrich Wurm, (1832–1910), early colonist of South Australia
 Harald Wurm (born 1984), Austrian cross country skier
 Jan Wurm, American painter
 John Nicholas Wurm (1927–1984), American Roman Catholic bishop
 Mary Wurm (1860–1938), English pianist and composer
 Ole Wurm (or Worm) (1588–1655), Danish physician and antiquary
 Stephen Wurm (1922–2001), Hungarian-born Australian linguist
 Theophil Wurm (1868–1953), German Lutheran bishop
 Wenzel von Wurm (1859-1921), Austro-Hungarian Army general

German-language surnames